The Crooked E: The Unshredded Truth About Enron is an American television movie aired by CBS in January 2003, which was based on the book Anatomy of Greed by Brian Cruver. The film, which stars Brian Dennehy, Christian Kane and Mike Farrell, and was directed by Penelope Spheeris, was a ratings hit for the network.

Synopsis
Based on the first-person book by Brian Cruver, Anatomy of Greed, The Crooked E television movie chronicles the rise and fall of the Houston-based Enron Corporation. The film offers the perspective of Cruver, played by Christian Kane, depicted as a brilliant but naïve young salesman who was seduced by the company's "get rich quick" mantra. The extravagant company culture is shown through scenes of extreme office parties, over-the-top expense accounts, and sexy female employees. When the company inevitably crashes in the fall of 2001, the film shows how shareholders and employees suffered the most. Real-life executives are portrayed in the film, including Enron Chairman Ken Lay played by Mike Farrell, CEO Jeff Skilling played by Jon Ted Wynne, and whistleblower Sherron Watkins played by Jan Skene, while other characters are renamed (presumably to protect the innocent) such as senior executive Mr. Blue played by Brian Dennehy.

Production
The Crooked E was filmed in Winnipeg, Manitoba, Canada.

Criticism
The author of the book and ex-Enron employee says that the strippers hired as secretaries have more exposure in the film than they did in his book and that the employee rallies were more dramatic in real life than in the film, but for the most part, the TV movie gets it right.

Related books and films
 Anatomy of Greed – Brian Cruver's book on which The Crooked E is based.
 Enron: The Smartest Guys in the Room - Documentary film depicting the rise and fall of Enron.

References

External links

 

2003 drama films
2003 television films
2003 films
Enron scandal
Films directed by Penelope Spheeris
Films set in Houston
American drama television films
2000s English-language films
2000s American films